Austins was a department store in the Diamond area of Derry in Northern Ireland. The store was established in 1830 and, until 2016, remained standing as the world's oldest independent department store. The building measures  and is five stories high, with an Edwardian-style baroque exterior built in 1906 by MA Robinson after the original building was destroyed by fire.  The Austins Department store building in the Diamond was owned by the City Hotel Group, but the actual retail operation was leased to Hassonzender, which went into liquidation.

The department store closed its doors to staff and the public without warning on 8 March 2016. The liquidators state that the unforeseen costs of dealing with asbestos, and the disruption to trading this would have entailed, proved to be a stumbling block to attracting investment and this led to the sudden closure. Derry City Council officials raised the issue of dealing with the asbestos following the introduction of new regulations, in the Spring of 2015.

References

Buildings and structures in Derry (city)
Department stores of Ireland
Defunct department stores of the United Kingdom
Grade B1 listed buildings
Department store buildings in the United Kingdom
1830 establishments in Ireland
2016 disestablishments in Northern Ireland